"Ladies Love Country Boys" is a song written by Jamey Johnson, Rivers Rutherford and George Teren, and recorded by American country music singer Trace Adkins. It was released in September 2006 as the second single from his album Dangerous Man. It reached the top of the Billboard Hot Country Songs chart and became Adkins' second Number One single and his first since "(This Ain't) No Thinkin' Thing" in 1997.

Music video
The music video was directed by Michael Salomon and premiered in late 2006.

Chart performance

Year-end charts

Certifications

References

2006 songs
2006 singles
Trace Adkins songs
Songs written by Jamey Johnson
Songs written by Rivers Rutherford
Song recordings produced by Frank Rogers (record producer)
Capitol Records Nashville singles
Music videos directed by Michael Salomon
Songs written by George Teren
Songs about school